Klaus Wilmsmeyer, Jr. (born December 4, 1967) is a Canadian-born former American football punter in the NFL for the San Francisco 49ers, New Orleans Saints, and the Miami Dolphins.

Wilmsmeyer attended Lorne Park Secondary School and played college football at the University of Louisville.

At the University of Louisville, Wilmsmeyer was the team's field goal kicker. His 52-yard field goal in 1989 is tied for the longest in school history.

As an NFL punter, Wilmsmeyer was part of the San Francisco 49ers team from 1992 to 1994, where he won Super Bowl XXIX.

After leaving San Francisco, he punted for the New Orleans Saints from 1995 to 1996.

In 1998, he rejoined the NFL as a Miami Dolphin, playing there for his final year in professional football.

1967 births
Living people
American football punters
Louisville Cardinals football players
Miami Dolphins players
New Orleans Saints players
San Francisco 49ers players
Sportspeople from Mississauga
Canadian players of American football
Gridiron football people from Ontario